Sophia Maria "Fiep" Westendorp (17 December 1916 – 3 February 2004) was a Dutch illustrator who became popular due to her long collaboration with writer Annie M.G. Schmidt with their creation of Jip and Janneke.

Career

Three generations of Dutch people have grown up with her illustrations. The drawings she made for Jip en Janneke, a series of stories which ran in Dutch newspaper Het Parool from 1953 to 1957, now adorn a variety of items sold by Dutch department store HEMA. Since the regular Dutch awards for illustrations always eluded her, she was given a unique award for her entire oeuvre in 1997.  Westendorp also drew a text comic based on the Annie M.G. Schmidt story Tante Patent in the 1950s.

Legacy
She died in 2004. Since 2007, the University of Amsterdam has had an endowed chair for illustration in Westendorp's honor.

References

1916 births
2004 deaths
Dutch illustrators
Dutch children's book illustrators
Dutch comics artists
Dutch women illustrators
Dutch female comics artists
People from Zaltbommel
Willem de Kooning Academy alumni